Eodorcadion dorcas is a species of beetle in the family Cerambycidae. It was described by Jakovlev in 1901. It is known from Mongolia.

Subspecies
 Eodorcadion dorcas annulatum Heyrovský, 1969
 Eodorcadion dorcas dorcas (Jakovlev, 1901)
 Eodorcadion dorcas fortecostatum Heyrovský, 1969
 Eodorcadion dorcas hircus Jakovlev, 1906
 Eodorcadion dorcas morosum (Jakovlev, 1901)
 Eodorcadion dorcas scabrosum Namhaidorzh, 1972

References

Dorcadiini
Beetles described in 1901